"All You Zombies" is a song by American rock band The Hooters, written by the band's founding members Eric Bazilian and Rob Hyman. It was first recorded live and released as a single in 1982. It was subsequently included on the band's debut album Amore (1983) and an extended version of the song was included on their second album Nervous Night (1985). This version was released as a single in 1985 and reached no. 58 on the US Billboard Hot 100. It also charted within the top 20 in Germany and New Zealand, but was most successful in Australia, where it reached Number 8 on the charts in 1985.

Background
Influenced by reggae music, co-writer Eric Bazilian said the band was working on a different song when the idea "just came to us, like a vision." The band members dropped their work on the other song and finished "All You Zombies" that night. Writing partner Rob Hyman believed the song to be the fastest they had written "that was of any quality."

The Hooters first released a version of "All You Zombies" recorded live at the Emerald City nightclub in Cherry Hill, New Jersey, on 11 April 1981. The single was released in 1982 by Eighty Percent Records. A different version of the song later appeared on the Amore album, released independently in 1983. Hyman and Bazilian had worked with Cyndi Lauper on her album She's So Unusual, which led to Columbia Records offering the band a contract. They re-released "All You Zombies" with additional instrumental sections, making the song almost six minutes long. It became a minor hit in the US, reaching the Billboard Hot 100 chart, and a top 10 success in Australia, where it peaked at no. 8 for two weeks in September 1985. The single also reached the top 20 in New Zealand and Germany.

Eric Bazilian told the Chicago Tribune in 1985 that he didn't know the meaning of the song despite having written it. "People ask us what it's about ... the weird thing is we didn't consciously put [the heavy stuff] there." Hyman later told Songfacts that the biblical images, including Moses and Noah, were not part of any agenda, though some radio stations refused to play it. "I love songs like that, you just listen and every time you hear it you kind of wonder what's going on." the song has no connection to the 1958 Robert A. Heinlein story " '—All You Zombies—' ".

Formats and track listings
 7" single (1982)
A. "All You Zombies" (Live) – 4:09
B. "Rescue Me" – 4:03

 7" single (1985)
A. "All You Zombies" (Long) – 5:54
B. "Nervous Night" – 3:57

 12" promo single (1985)
A. "All You Zombies" (Long) – 5:54
B. "All You Zombies" (Short) – 3:52

 12" single (1986)
A. "All You Zombies" (Extended Version) – 5:58
B. "Where Do the Children Go" (Extended Version) – 5:29

Charts

Weekly charts

Year-end charts

Cover versions
 The song was covered by German singer Sandra for her eighth studio album The Art of Love (2007). It was then released as a promotional single to radio stations in Poland where it received considerable airplay.
 German band Santiano covered the song in German as "Bis in alle Ewigkeit (Walhalla)" on their 2013 album Mit den Gezeiten. They changed the lyrics into a song about the Vikings going to Valhalla.

References

External links
 The Hooters at Discogs

1982 songs
1982 singles
1985 singles
Columbia Records singles
The Hooters songs
Sandra (singer) songs
Song recordings produced by Rick Chertoff
Songs written by Eric Bazilian
Songs written by Rob Hyman